Bălescu may refer to:

Surname
Radu Bălescu
Cătălin Bălescu
, Romanian vice-admiral, the namesake of the naval training school of Romanian Naval Forces

Places
Bălescu River

See also
Bălcescu
Băldescu
Bălescu Mare River